Gypsy Colt is a 1954 American drama film directed by Andrew Marton and starring Donna Corcoran, Ward Bond and Frances Dee. Shot in Ansco Color, it was produced and distributed by Hollywood studio Metro-Goldwyn-Mayer. The film's basic plot was taken from Lassie Come Home with the focus changed from a dog to the eponymous horse.

A 60-minute version of Gypsy Colt was made available in 1967 as part of the weekly TV anthology Off to See the Wizard.

Plot
A young girl, Meg (Donna Corcoran), is disheartened when her parents Frank (Ward Bond) and Em MacWade (Frances Dee) are forced to sell Gypsy Colt, her favorite horse, to a rancher. Gypsy Colt escapes several times, ultimately taking a 500-mile journey to return to his rightful owner.

Cast
 Donna Corcoran as Meg
 Ward Bond as Frank
 Frances Dee as Em
 Lee Van Cleef as Hank
 Larry Keating as Wade Y. Gerald
 Nacho Galindo as Pancho
 Rodolfo Hoyos Jr. as Rodolfo
 Peggy Maley as Pat
 Robert Hyatt as Phil Gerald (as Bobby Hyatt)
 Highland Dale as Gypsy, the Horse

Reception
According to MGM records, the movie earned $721,000 in the U.S. and Canada and $704,000 in other markets, making a profit of $259,000.

Comic book adaptation
 Dell Four Color #568 (June 1954)

References

External links
 
 Gypsy Colt at TCMDB
 
 

1954 films
Films about horses
Metro-Goldwyn-Mayer films
1954 drama films
American drama films
Films adapted into comics
1950s English-language films
Films directed by Andrew Marton
1950s American films